Echis (common names: saw-scaled vipers, carpet vipers) is a genus of vipers found in the dry regions of Africa, the Middle East, India, Sri Lanka and Pakistan. They have a characteristic threat display, rubbing sections of their body together to produce a "sizzling" warning sound. The name Echis is the Latin transliteration of the Greek word for "viper" (ἔχις). Like all vipers, they are venomous. Their common name is "saw-scaled vipers" and they include some of the species responsible for causing the most snakebite cases and deaths in the world. Twelve species are currently recognized.

Description

The head is relatively small and is short, wide, pear-shaped and distinct from the neck. The snout is short and rounded, while the eyes are relatively large and the body is moderately slender and cylindrical. The dorsal scales are mostly keeled. However, the scales on the lower flanks stick out at a distinct 45° angle and have a central ridge, or keel, that is serrated (hence the common name). The tail is short and the subcaudals are single.

A saw-scaled viper of the genus Echis may be responsible for biblical claims of a fiery flying serpent.

Geographic range
Species of this genus are found in Pakistan, India (in rocky regions of Maharashtra, Rajasthan, Uttar Pradesh, and Punjab) and Sri Lanka, parts of the Middle East, and Africa north of the equator.

Behaviour
All members of this genus have a distinctive threat display, which involves forming a series of parallel, C-shaped coils and rubbing their scales together to produce a sizzling sound, rather like water on a hot plate. The proper term for this is stridulation. As they become more agitated, this stridulating behavior becomes faster and louder. This display is thought to have evolved as a means of limiting water loss, such as might occur when hissing. However, some authors describe this display as being accompanied by loud hissing.

These snakes can be fierce and will strike from the position described above. When doing so, they may overbalance and end up moving towards their aggressor (an unusual behavior for snakes).

Saw-scaled vipers are highly aggressive compared to many of their cousins and they commonly strike to bite.

Diet
Little is known about the diets of some Echis species. For others, their diets are reported to be extremely varied, and may include items such as locusts, beetles, worms, slugs, spiders, scorpions, centipedes, solifugids, frogs, toads, reptiles (including other snakes), small mammals, and birds.

Reproduction
Most Echis species, such as those found in Africa, are oviparous, while others, such as those in India, are viviparous.

Venom
The snake venom of Echis species consists mostly of four types of toxins: neurotoxins, cardiotoxins, hemotoxins, and cytotoxins. The genus is recognized as medically significant in many tropical rural areas. They are widespread and live in areas lacking modern medical facilities. Most victims are bitten after dark when these snakes are active.

Most of these species have venom that contains factors that can cause a consumption coagulopathy and defibrination, which may persist for days to weeks. This may result in bleeding anywhere in the body, including the possibility of an intracranial hemorrhage. The latter classically occurs a few days following the bite.

Venom toxicity varies among the different species, geographic locations, individual specimens, sexes, over the seasons, different milkings, and, of course, the method of injection (subcutaneous, intramuscular,  or intravenous). Consequently, the  values for Echis venoms differ significantly. In mice, the intravenous LD50 ranges from 2.3 mg/kg (U.S. Navy, 1991) to 24.1 mg/kg (Christensen, 1955) to 0.44–0.48 mg/kg (Cloudsley-Thompson, 1988). In humans, the lethal dose is estimated to be up to 5 mg in some subspecies (Daniels, J. C. 2002). Venom from females was more than twice as toxic on average as venom from males.

The amount of venom produced also varies. Reported yields include 20–35 mg of dried venom from specimens 41–56 cm in length, 6–48 mg (16 mg average) from Iranian specimens and 13–35 mg of dried venom from animals from various other localities. Yield varies seasonally, as well as between the sexes: the most venom is produced during the summer months and males produce more than females.

Species

*) Not including the nominate subspecies
T) Type species

Taxonomy
The taxonomy of the group was long confused, with a plethora of species of uncertain status. Several recent studies have clarified the diversity within the genus. This included the descriptions of E. omanensis and E. romani.

A mitochondrial DNA phylogeny for the genus demonstrated the distinctiveness of E. borkini, E. jogeri and E. khosatzkii, but showed E. multisquamatus to be a synonym of E. carinatus.

References

Further reading

 Boquet P. 1967. "Pharmacology and toxicology of snake venoms of Europe and the Mediterranean regions". In: Bucherl W, editor. 1967. Venomous Animals and their Venoms. Vol. I. Paris: Masson. pp 340–58.
 Boulenger GA. 1890. The Fauna of British India, Including Ceylon and Burma. Reptilia and Batrachia. London: Secretary of State for India in Council. (Taylor & Francis, printers). xviii + 541 pp.
 Boulenger GA. 1896. Catalogue of the Snakes in the British Museum (Natural History). Volume III., Containing the ... Viperidæ. London: Trustees of the British Museum (Natural History). (Taylor and Francis, printers). xiv + 727 excrpp. + Plates I.- XXV. (Genus Echis, p. 504).
 Cherlin, VA. 1990. Taxonomic revision of the snake genus Echis (Viperidae). II. An analysis of taxonomy and description of new forms. Proceedings of the Zoological Institute, Leningrad, USSR Academy of Schience 207: 193-223. [202]. (in Russian).
 Christensen PA. 1955. South African Snake Venoms and Antivenins. Johannesburg: South African Institute of Medical Research. 35 pp.
 Cloudsley-Thompson JL. 1988. The saw-scaled viper Echis carinatus. British Herpetological Society Bulletin 24:32-33.
 Gray JE. 1849. Catalogue of the Specimens of Snakes in the Collection of the British Museum. London: Trustees of the British Museum. (Edward Newman, printer). xv + 125 pp. [29].
 Latifi M. 1991. The Snakes of Iran. Second Edition. Oxford, Ohio: Published by the Department of the Environment and the Society for the Study of Amphibians and Reptiles. 156 pp. .
 Merrem B. 1820. Versuch eines Systems der Amphibien. Tentamen Systematis Amphibiorum. Marburg: J.C. Krieger. xv + 191 pp. + 1 plate. [149].
 Minton SA Jr. 1967. "Snakebite". In: Beeson PB, McDermott W, editors. 1967. Cecil and Loeb Textbook of Medicine. Philadelphia: Saunders. 420 pp.
 Minton SA Jr. 1974. Venom Diseases. Springfield, Illinois: CC Thomas. 386 pp.
 U.S. Navy. 1991. Poisonous Snakes of the World. United States Government. New York: Dover Publications Inc. 203 pp. .

External links

 Echis photo gallery at Herpetology of Africa. Accessed 9 September 2006.
 
 Photograph of a bite to the leg inflicted by saw-scaled viper

Viperinae
Snake genera
Taxa named by Blasius Merrem